{{Infobox settlement
| name                    = Mariyammanahalli
| other_name              = Narayanadevarakere
| nickname                = 
| settlement_type         = town
| image_skyline           = 
| image_alt               = 
| image_caption           = 
| pushpin_map             = Karnataka
| pushpin_label_position  = right
| pushpin_map_alt         = 
| pushpin_map_caption     = Location in Karnataka, India
| coordinates             = 
| subdivision_type        = Country
| subdivision_name        = 
| subdivision_type1       = State
| subdivision_name1       = Karnataka
| subdivision_type2       = District
| subdivision_name2       = Vijayanagara
| established_title       = 
| established_date        = 
| founder                 = 
| named_for               = 
| parts_type              = Talukas
| parts                   = Hospet
| government_type         = 
| governing_body          = 
| unit_pref               = Metric
| area_footnotes          = 
| area_rank               = 
| area_total_km2          = 
| elevation_footnotes     = 
| elevation_m             = 523
| population_total        = 12195
| population_as_of        = 2001
| population_rank         = 
| population_density_km2  = 25000
| population_demonym      = 
| population_footnotes    = 
| demographics_type1      = Languages
| demographics1_title1    = Official
| demographics1_info1     = Kannada
| timezone1               = IST
| utc_offset1             = +5:30
| postal_code_type        = PIN
| postal_code             = 583222
| area_code_type          = Telephone code
| area_code               = 08394
| registration_plate      = KA 35
| blank1_name_sec1        = Nearest city
| blank1_info_sec1        = Hospet
| blank2_name_sec1        = Lok Sabha constituency
| blank2_info_sec1        = bellary
| blank3_name_sec1        = Vidhan Sabha constituency
| blank3_info_sec1        = Hagaribommanahalli
| blank1_name_sec2        = Climate
| blank1_info_sec2        = hot (Köppen)
| website                 = {{URL|'''}}
| iso_code                = IN-KA
| footnotes               =                        

}}Mariyammanahalli''' (previously known as Sri Narayanadevarakere) is a town in the southern state of Karnataka, India. It is located in Vijayanagar (Hospet) Taluk, in the Vijayanagar district of Karnataka, south of Danapuram and east of Ankasamudra

Demographics

In 2011, there were 3,243 families in the village, with a total population of 15,940, of which 7,944 were males, and 7,996 were females.

The native language of Mariyammanahalli is Kannada, but English is also spoken in the town.

See also
 Hospet
 Bellary
 Districts of Karnataka

References

Villages in Bellary district